"They Asked About You" is a song written by Freddy Weller, Bill Nash and Kim Nash, and recorded by American country music artist Reba McEntire.  It was released in December 1993 as the second and final single from her compilation album Greatest Hits Volume Two.  The song reached #7 on the Billboard Hot Country Singles & Tracks chart in March 1994.

It debuted at #48 on the Hot Country Singles & Tracks for the week of December 25, 1993.

Chart performance

References

1993 singles
1993 songs
Reba McEntire songs
Songs written by Freddy Weller
Song recordings produced by Tony Brown (record producer)
MCA Records singles